Jeqjeq-e Olya (also Romanized as Jeqjeq-e ‘Olyā; also known as Dzhigdzhig, Jeqjeq, Jeq Jeq-e Bālā, Jeqjeq-e Bālā, Jīghjīgh, and Jigjig) is a village in Yurchi-ye Sharqi Rural District, Kuraim District, Nir County, Ardabil Province, Iran. At the 2006 census, its population was 25, in 6 families.

References 

Tageo

Towns and villages in Nir County